A microdot is text or an image substantially reduced in size to prevent detection by unintended recipients. The name comes from the fact that the microdots have often been about the size and shape of a typographical dot, such as a period or the tittle of a lowercase i or j. Microdots are, fundamentally, a steganographic approach to message protection.

History 

In 1870 during the Franco-Prussian War, Paris was under siege and messages were sent by carrier pigeon. Parisian photographer René Dagron used microfilm to permit each pigeon to carry a high volume of messages, as pigeons can carry little weight.

Improvement in technology since then has made even more miniaturization possible.
At the International Congress of Photography in Paris in 1925 Emanuel Goldberg presented a method of producing extreme reduction microdots using a two-stage process. First, an initial reduced negative was made, then the image of the negative was projected from the eyepiece of a modified microscope onto a collodium emulsion where the microscope specimen slide would be. The reduction was such that a page of text would be legibly reproduced in a surface of 0.01 mm2. This density is comparable to the entire text of the Bible fifty times over in one square inch. Goldberg's "Mikrat" (microdot) was prominently reported at the time in English, French and German publications.

A technique comparable to modern microdots for steganographic purposes was first used in Germany between World War I and World War II. It was also later used by many countries to pass messages through insecure postal channels. Later microdot techniques used film with aniline dye, rather than silver halide layers, as this was even harder for counter-espionage agents to find.

A popular article on espionage by J. Edgar Hoover in the Reader's Digest in 1946 attributed invention of microdots to "the famous Professor Zapp at the Technical University Dresden". However, there never was a Professor Zapp at that university and microdot historian William White has denounced Hoover's article as a "concoction of semitruths and overt disinformation".

Nevertheless, this article was reprinted, translated, and widely and uncritically cited in the literature on espionage. Hoover's Zapp has been wrongly identified with Walter Zapp, inventor of the Minox camera, which was used by spies but did not make microdots. Hoover appears to have conflated Emanuel Goldberg, who was a professor in Dresden, with Kurt Zapp who, late in the Second World War, was in Dresden and taught spies how to make microdots. A World War II spy kit for microdot production was sometimes called a Zapp outfit.

In Germany after the Berlin Wall was erected, special cameras were used to generate microdots which were then attached to letters and sent through the regular mail. These microdots often went unnoticed by inspectors, and information could be read by the intended recipient using a microscope.

Modern usage

Microdot identification

Microdot identification is a process where tiny identification tags are etched or coded with a given number, or for use on vehicles, a vehicle VIN, asset identification number or a unique serial number. Unique personal identification numbers (PIN), asset identification number or customized customer data entries are also available. The microdots are brushed or sprayed onto the key parts of an asset to provide complete parts marking. The technology was developed in the United States in the 1990s before being commercialized by various manufacturers and distributors around the world.

In South Africa it is a legal requirement to have microdot fitted to all new vehicles sold since September 2012 and to all vehicles that require police clearance.

Most printers print in addition to the documents requested on the pages tiny yellow dots containing printer serial number and time stamp. These are not microdots, but arrays of difficult-to-see dots across the printed page in an encoded pattern.

See also 

 Photolithography

References

External links
Microdot photography
Microdot Technology
Anti Theft Microdot technology in INDIA

Steganography